The 2016 Elazığ bombing was a car bombing targeting a police station in Elazığ, Turkey on 18 August 2016 a Thursday. Attack was perpetrated by Kurdistan Workers' Party (PKK). Six people including one perpetrator died in the attack and 217 others were injured. Two people were arrested related to the attack. The PKK claimed that the attack had killed more than 100 police officers while wounding over 150. The next day, crowds were protesting the assault on the police headquarters.

References 

2016 crimes in Turkey
August 2016 events in Turkey
History of Elazığ Province
Kurdish–Turkish conflict (1978–present)
Mass murder in 2016
Suicide bombings in 2016
Terrorist incidents in Turkey in 2015